The Great Concert of Charles Mingus is a live album by the jazz bassist and composer Charles Mingus, recorded at the Théâtre des Champs-Élysées, Paris, France, on April 19, 1964. It was originally released as a triple album in 1971 on the French America label. The album was recorded just two days after the live sessions that produced Revenge!, which was also recorded live in Paris.

Track listing
All songs written by Charles Mingus, except where noted. On the original vinyl release, "So Long Eric (Don’t Stay Over There Too Long)" was credited as "Goodbye Pork Pie Hat", "Parkeriana" was credited as "Parker Iana", "Meditations On Integration" was credited as "Meditation For Integration". These three errors have been corrected in subsequent editions on CD. On April 18, during the preceding concert at The Salle Wagram, after playing "So Long Eric", Johnny Coles became ill and fainted on stage. For this reason, Coles only appears on "So Long Eric." Coles can be heard on recordings of other dates during Mingus' concert tour.

Vinyl pressing

CD pressing

Personnel

Charles Mingus (bass)
Eric Dolphy (alto saxophone, bass clarinet, flute)
Johnny Coles (trumpet) on "Goodbye Pork Pie Hat" / "So Long Eric" only
Clifford Jordan (tenor saxophone)
Jaki Byard (piano)
Dannie Richmond (drums)

References

External links
http://www.jazzdisco.org/charles-mingus/catalog/#america-30-am-003-005
http://www.discogs.com/Charles-Mingus-The-Great-Concert-Of-Charles-Mingus/master/239126

1964 live albums
America Records live albums
Charles Mingus live albums